The Nordic Prize (Swedish: nordiska pris) is a literary award presented annually by the Swedish Academy. The recipient is someone from the Nordic countries who has done significant work in any of the Academy's areas of operations or interests. The inaugural award was in 1986 and was founded with a donation from Karen and Karl Ragnar Gierows. The prize has been referred to as the "little Nobel" because it is awarded by the same Academy that gives the Nobel Prize.

Recipients

References

Swedish Academy
Awards established in 1985
Literary awards honoring writers
Nordic literary awards
Swedish literary awards
1985 establishments in Sweden